Craig Rau Glendinning (born 12 January 1973) is a former New Zealand rugby union player, who represented both New Zealand Māori and . He usually played as a flanker.

Career
Of Māori descent, he played three matches for New Zealand Māori in 1997, before going on to play for Samoa between 1999 and 2001. His first cap for Samoa as a number 8 against , at Osaka, on 22 May 1999. He played three matches for Samoa at the 1999 Rugby World Cup. His final cap for Samoa was against , at Tokyo, on 8 July 2001.

References

1973 births
Living people
Rugby union players from Auckland
Samoa international rugby union players
New Zealand expatriate sportspeople in Samoa
New Zealand rugby union players
New Zealand Māori rugby union players
New Zealand sportspeople of Samoan descent
New Zealand expatriate rugby union players
Benetton Rugby players
Expatriate rugby union players in Italy
New Zealand expatriate sportspeople in Italy
Rugby union flankers
Rugby union number eights
Counties Manukau rugby union players
Northland rugby union players
Southland rugby union players